SH3D21 is a nuclear protein that is encoded by the SH3D21 gene. In humans, this gene is located on chromosome 1 p34.3. The human mRNA transcript is 2527 base pairs and the final protein product is 756 amino acids.   While the exact function of this protein remains unknown, due to the presence of three SH3 domains, it has been implicated in protein-protein interactions.

Gene 

SH3D21 is expressed in low levels in most tissue.  Microarray analysis has shown SH3D21 expression to be decreased in TP63 knockout mice. SH3D21 has been shown to be expressed highly in the superior cervical ganglion, the dorsal root ganglia and the trigeminal ganglion.  Transcription of SH3D21 is known to be upregulated in the presence of testosterone.

Protein 

SH3D21 contains three SH3 domains. These domains are located near the N-terminus of the protein. In humans, these SH3 domains have a common amino acid sequence Asp-Glu-Leu. This sequence motif is also conserved in other species. SH3D21 has been found to interact with Adenylate Kinase 2, Artemin, and Importin 13. The human protein has two isoforms and no paralogs. The second isoform is 645 amino acids long and is identical to the first isoform, except it is missing the first 111 amino acids.  Due to this, the second isoform is missing the first, and half of the second, N-terminal SH3 domain. Secondary structure analysis of SH3D21 indicates a long alpha helical structure near the C-terminus.  The purpose of this structure is unknown. SH3D21 is predicted to have many phosphorylation sites and multiple sumoylation sites throughout the entirety of the protein.

Function 

The function of this gene is still unclear. However, research has linked SH3D21 expression changes to male infertility and Ataxia Telangiectasia.
Further studies have implicated the chromosomal region of 1p34.3 in Intracranial Aneurysm and as a negative prognosis sign in colorectal cancer. These studies do not, however, directly mention SH3D21.

Homology 

SH3D21 is well-conserved in mammals. BLAST analysis found distant orthologs in Osteichthyes with a max identity of 28%. Sequence identity was calculated using available sequence data and ALIGN software.

References